The Revolutionary Democratic Front is a populist political party in El Salvador. It was founded in 2006 as a rightwing split from the Farabundo Marti National Liberation Front. The party received 0.95% of the vote in the 18 January 2009 legislative election.

External links
Official web site of the party

Political parties in El Salvador